The BT-42 was a Finnish assault gun, constructed during the Continuation War. It was constructed from captured Soviet BT-7 light tanks and British 4.5-inch howitzers (114 mm-calibre light howitzer, model 1908) from 1918, which had been donated during the Winter War. Only eighteen  vehicles were constructed.

Development and use
As the Second World War progressed, the Soviets were fielding better and better tanks. The Finnish Army, on the other hand, had to make do with a large number of captured tanks, which were for the most part lightly armored and armed.

The Finns decided to redesign the BT-7 Model 1937 tank. They constructed a new turret fitted with 76 K/02 gun sights and armed it with British-made 114.3 mm howitzers that had been supplied by the British during the Winter War (Q.F. 4,5 inch howitzer Mark II, also known as 114 Psv.H/18 in Finland). Eighteen BT-42 were built and these were pressed into service in 1943.

These converted vehicles quickly became very unpopular with their crews. The weaknesses could mainly be attributed to the new turret, which apart from giving the tank a high-profile also added significant weight to the vehicle, stressing the suspension and the engine.

The BT-42 was used for the first time in 1943, at the Svir River, where it was used against enemy pillboxes. The design worked reasonably well against soft targets but was completely unsuitable for anti-tank warfare. 

To counter this, the Finns copied a German-designed HEAT round for the gun and it was initially thought that it would be effective against the sloped armour of the T-34. However, problems arose with the copied HEAT shells fuses, which apparently did not arm themselves correctly after firing, due to the different muzzle velocity and round spin rate of the 4.5-inch howitzer compared to the original German guns.

The BT-42s were used again during  the major Soviet offensive in 1944. They were deployed in the defence of Vyborg. In one encounter, a Finnish BT-42 hit a Soviet IS-2 18 times, failing even to immobilize the enemy vehicle, as this vehicle's fuses failed to work correctly. Eight of the 18 BT-42s in action made no significant contribution to the fighting. At the time Finnish armoured units were still composed mostly of older designs such as the Vickers 6-Ton, T-26  and T-28 tanks, and all of these suffered losses.

Emergency supplies of Panzer IV tanks and StuG III self-propelled assault guns from Germany made it possible for the Finns to replace their losses with more effective vehicles. The BT-42 was retired soon after the Vyborg battles, replaced in their role with German-made StuG IIIs. Finland also used captured T-34s, as well as receiving more of these vehicles from Germany's stock of captured enemy kits.

See also

BT-43 - another Finnish conversion of the BT-7 tank

Footnotes

External links
Specifications and operational use at www.jaegerplatoon.net
YouTube: BT-42 (English subtitles)

World War II military equipment of Finland
World War II assault guns
Tanks of Finland
Military vehicles introduced from 1940 to 1944